Lucas is an unincorporated community in Logan County, Illinois, United States. Lucas is located along U.S. Route 136 west of McLean.

References

Unincorporated communities in Logan County, Illinois
Unincorporated communities in Illinois